Kabaddi Kabaddi may refer to 

Kabadi Kabadi (2001 film), 2001 Indian Tamil-language film
Kabaddi Kabaddi (2003 film), 2003 Indian Telugu-language film
Kabadi Kabadi (2008 film)
Kabaddi Kabaddi (2015 film), 2015 Nepalese film

See also
Kabaddi, a contact team sport